The American Academy of Health Physics (AAHP) is a non-profit organization based in McLean, VA which serves to advance the profession of health physics through networking opportunities for members, certification of health physicists, and advisement to professionals to increase the application of health physics. The   Academy   has selective criteria for membership in the organization.

Mission statement

The American Academy of Health Physics is a registered 501(c)3 non-profit organization which seeks to advance the goals of the Health Physics profession, advises the highest moral integrity in the practice of Health Physics, and improves the connections between health physicists, providing an avenue for Certified Health Physicists to obtain certification in the profession. The mission of the AAHP is accomplished with a specific Strategic Plan.

Membership 

Those eligible for full membership for the American Academy of Health Physics are all individuals who have been granted certification in Comprehensive Health Physics by the American Board of Health Physics (ABHP). Those completing the first part of the two-part exam are eligible for associate membership. As of May 2012, the AAHP has 1,336 members.

Leadership 

The President is. John R. Frazier, who has over 32 years of experience workinking  as a health physicist for the U.S. FDA Bureau of Radiological Health (1977-1980), Oak Ridge Associated Universities (1980-1986), IT Corporation (1986-1993), and Auxier & Associates (1993-2004)

Awards and Recognitions 
The Academy has several awards

William McAdams Outstanding Service Award 

The   William McAdams Outstanding Service Award, is  named after one of the founders of the Certification process for  health physicists, William A. McAdams,  It is given to those certified Health Physicists  who have made a significant contribution toward the advancement of professionalism in Health Physics and to the Certification process. The award may be given posthumously. It has been awarded to:

1989 – John W. Healy
1990 – H. Wade Patterson
1991 – Richard R. Bowers
1992 – Lester A. Slaback Jr.
1993 – Kenneth W. Skrable
1994 – Leroy F. Booth
1995 – William R. Casey
1996 – Frazier L. Bronson
1997 – Robert M. Ryan
1998 – Dale H. Denham
1999 – Bryce L. Rich
2000 – James E. Turner
2001 – George J. Vargo Jr.
2002 – Paul L. Ziemer
2003 – Herman Cember
2004 – Edward F. Maher
2005 – Dade W. Moeller
2006 – William C. Reinig
2007 – Kathryn H. Pryor
2008 – James S. Willison
2009 – Michael S. Terpilak
2010 – Nancy P. Kirner
2011 – Jerry W. Hiatt
2012 – Robert N. Cherry Jr.

Joyce P. Davis Memorial Award 

The Joyce P. Davis Memorial Award is given in memory and honor of Joyce P. Davis to those distinguished for excellence in professional achievement ,  outstanding ethical behavior,  and interpersonal skills. It has been awarded to:

John J. Kelly, 2002 
James E. Tarpinian, 2004 
Carol D. Berger, 2006 
Howard W. Dickson, 2008 
Frazier L. Bronson, 2010

Academy of Service Award 

The Academy of Service Award is awarded for exceptional service to the AAHP during the immediate Past President’s term of office. Recipients have been: 
Nancy Johnson, 2008 
E. Scott Medling, 2009 
Dan Strom, 2010 
Kyle Kleinhans, 2011 
Sandra J. Brereton, 2012

Certification as Health Physicist 

Certified Health Physicist is a title regulated by the American Board of Health Physics. It  designates a  health physicist  certified in the application of health physics through competency and holistic review by the American Board of Health Physics. There are a number of requirements to obtain such certification.

Other Relevant Organizations 

American Board of Medical Physics (ABMP)
American Board of Radiology (ABR)
American Board of Science in Nuclear Medicine (ABSNM)
American College of Medical Physics (ACMP)
American College of Radiology (ACR)
The Canadian College of Physics in Medicine
National Registry of Radiation Protection Technologists (NRRPT)
American Association of Physicists in Medicine (AAPM)

References 

Medical and health organizations based in Virginia
Health physicists